= Club Municipal =

Club Municipal may refer to:

- Club Centro Deportivo Municipal, a football club from Peru
- Club Social y Deportivo Municipal, a football club from Guatemala
